Maccabi Kiryat Gat is a professional basketball team based in the city of Kiryat Gat, Israel.

History
In 2013, the club was relegated to the Liga Artzit, due to financial issues. In 2014, they promoted back to the second division. In 2015, they promoted back to the Premier League after winning the Finals against Kiryat Ata.

On July 16, 2018, Maccabi Kiryat Gat was dissolved due to financial issues.

Arenas
The team played home games at the Ashkelon Sports Arena.

Honors
Liga Leumit
Champions (1): 2014–15

Season by season

Notable players

See also
 Maccabi Kiryat Gat F.C.
 FC Kiryat Gat

References

Kiryat Gat B.C.
Basketball teams established in 1995
1995 establishments in Israel
Kiryat Gat B.C.
Sport in Kiryat Gat